The 1980–81 Divizia B was the 41st season of the second tier of the Romanian football league system.

The format has been maintained to three series, each of them having 18 teams. At the end of the season the winners of the series promoted to Divizia A and the last four places from each series relegated to Divizia C.

Team changes

To Divizia B
Promoted from Divizia C
 Ceahlăul Piatra Neamț
 Borzești
 CSU Galați
 IMU Medgidia
 Sirena București
 ROVA Roșiori
 Minerul Lupeni
 CFR Timișoara
 Rapid Arad
 CIL Sighetu Marmației
 Metalul Aiud
 Oltul Sfântu Gheorghe

Relegated from Divizia A
 CS Târgoviște
 Olimpia Satu Mare
 Gloria Buzău

From Divizia B
Relegated to Divizia C
 Muscelul Câmpulung
 Energia Slatina
 Unirea Alba Iulia
 ICIM Brașov
 Carpați Mârșa
 IS Câmpia Turzii
 Energia Gheorghiu-Dej
 Chimia Turnu Magurele
 Someșul Satu Mare
 Portul Constanța
 FCM Giurgiu
 Strungul Arad

Promoted to Divizia A
 FCM Brașov
 Progresul Vulcan București
 Corvinul Hunedoara

Other teams
FC Brăila and Progresul Brăila merged, the second one being absorbed by the first one. FC Brăila was renamed as FCM Progresul Brăila.

Progresul Brăila's vacant place was occupied by Chimia Brăila.

Unirea Focșani and Dinamo Focșani merged, the second one being absorbed by the first one. After the merge, Unirea Focșani was renamed as Unirea Dinamo Focșani.

League tables

Serie I

Serie II

Serie III

See also 
 1980–81 Divizia A

References

Liga II seasons
Romania
2